Paul Kent may refer to:
 Paul Kent (actor) (1930–2011), American actor
 Paul Kent (journalist) (born 1969), Australian journalist and former rugby player
 Paul Kent (swimmer) (born 1972), New Zealand swimmer